Men's 58 kg competition at the Taekwondo at the 2015 European Games in Baku, Azerbaijan, took place on 16 June at the Crystal Hall complex.

Schedule
All times are Azerbaijan Summer Time (UTC+5).

Results

Repechage

References

External links

Taekwondo at the 2015 European Games